Femsjøen is a lake in the municipality of Halden in Østfold county, Norway. It is the source of the river Tista.

Referencesrences

See also
List of lakes in Norway

Halden
Lakes of Viken (county)